Unnikrishnan Thiruvazhiyode (born 1942) is an Indian civil servant and a Malayalam language novelist from the state of Kerala. He received the Kerala Sahitya Akademi Award in 1992 for the novel Driksakshi.

Education and career
Unnikrishnan earned Bachelor of Science in Physics from Government Victoria College, Palakkad and then earned a Bachelor of Education degree from Feroke Training College. He later went on to earn Advanced Financial Management from Strathclyde University, Scotland and in Public Sector Management from Leeds University, United Kingdom.

He commenced his career as a teacher in 1963. He later joined the Central Secretariat Service in 1966 and retired in year 2002 as Deputy Secretary to Government of India from Ministry of Heavy Industries and Public Enterprises.

Life
He was born in Thiruvazhiyode village in Palakkad district of Kerala, in 1942. He is married to Sridevi and has three children, Amrita, Namrata and Abhilash. The writer resides in New Delhi.

Works
 Stories
 Ha Paris
 Thiruvazhiydinte Kathakal

 Novels
 Hippy
 Oru Dhwani Aayiram Prathidhwani
 Maranathinte Niram
 Nakhakshathangal
 Panam
 Driksakshi
 Choothattam
 Neelamalakalile Suvarna Nnjhorikal
 Layanam
 Manassakshi

 Novelettes
 Velichhathinte Porulukal
 Nakhachitrangal
 Sisiranidra

 Other works
 Theekkudukka (Drama)
 Thaalam Thavalam (Radio play)
 Aahuthi (Radio play)

External links
 Kerala Sahitya Akademi Award for Novel

References

1942 births
Living people
Indian civil servants
Central Secretariat Service officers
Indian male novelists
Malayali people
Writers from Palakkad
Malayalam-language writers
Malayalam novelists
Malayalam short story writers
Recipients of the Kerala Sahitya Akademi Award
Government Victoria College, Palakkad alumni
20th-century Indian novelists
Indian male short story writers
20th-century Indian short story writers
Novelists from Kerala
20th-century Indian male writers